A mini-LP or mini-album is a short vinyl record album or LP, usually retailing at a lower price than an album that would be considered full-length. It is distinct from an EP due to containing more tracks and a slightly longer running length. A mini-LP is not to be confused with the Japanese CDs issued in a "mini LP sleeve" or "paper jacket".

In South Korea, a mini album is a type of music release that contains 4-7 songs. It is shorter than a full album but longer than a single album. It is usually synonymous with extended play, however, some music distributors may classify mini albums with 7 or more songs as an album. 

Artists often use the chronological placement of a mini album in their discography as part of the title of the release. For example, 2NE1 1st Mini Album or Taste of Love: The 10th Mini Album.

History
Mini-LPs became popular in the early 1980s with record companies who targeted consumers who were reluctant to buy full-length and full-priced albums. Several mini-LPs had been released in the late 1970s, including John Cooper Clarke's Walking Back to Happiness, which used the 10-inch format. The format was usually 12-inch or 10-inch vinyl, with a playing time of between twenty and thirty minutes, and around seven tracks. They were often used as a way of introducing new acts to the market or as a way of releasing interim albums by established acts between their main albums. Epic Records introduced the 10-inch Nu-Disk format in the early 1980s (an example being Cheap Trick's 1980 release Found All the Parts), but they found it difficult to merchandise, and 12-inch mini-LPs became more common. Notable mini-LPs of the early 1980s included U2's Under a Blood Red Sky, which reached number 2 on the UK Albums Chart in 1983, and The Honeydrippers' Volume 1, which reached number 4 on the Billboard 200 in 1984. 

Independent record labels often released mini-LPs by artists before releasing full-length albums. In 1987, 4AD took this approach with both Pixies Come on Pilgrim debut and the second album by Throwing Muses, The Fat Skier.

In 2018, Kanye West spearheaded an effort to release five mini-albums from five different artists in five weeks. He led the release of Daytona by Pusha T, Ye by Kanye West, Kids See Ghosts by Kids See Ghosts (a project consisting of Kanye West and Kid Cudi), K.T.S.E. by Teyana Taylor and Nasir by Nas.

References

Album types
Audio storage
Recorded music